Yana Borodina (born 21 April 1992) is a Russian athlete who competes in the triple jump with a personal best result of 14.41 metres. She won the bronze medal at the 2012 European Athletics Championships in Helsinki.

Competition record

References

External links 
 

1992 births
Living people
Russian female triple jumpers
European Athletics Championships medalists